Ghilene Brittany “Ghil” Joseph (born 1997) is an American-raised Guyanese footballer who plays as a midfielder or a forward for the Guyana women's national team.

Early life
Joseph was raised in East Brunswick, New Jersey. She is of Chinese descent through her maternal family.

College career
Joseph has attended the East Brunswick High School in her hometown and the Arcadia University in Glenside, Pennsylvania.

Club career
Joseph has played for Stirling University WFC in Scotland.

International career
Joseph capped for Guyana at senior level during the 2018 CONCACAF Women's Championship qualification.

See also
List of Guyana women's international footballers

References

1997 births
Living people
East Brunswick High School alumni
Guyanese women's footballers
Women's association football midfielders
Women's association football forwards
Alumni of the University of Stirling
Guyana women's international footballers
Guyanese people of Chinese descent
Sportspeople of Chinese descent
Guyanese expatriate footballers
Guyanese expatriates in Scotland
Expatriate women's footballers in Scotland
Women's futsal players
People from East Brunswick, New Jersey
Sportspeople from Middlesex County, New Jersey
Soccer players from New Jersey
American women's soccer players

Arcadia University alumni
College women's soccer players in the United States
African-American women's soccer players
American sportspeople of Guyanese descent
American sportspeople of Chinese descent
American expatriate women's soccer players
American expatriate sportspeople in Scotland
American women's futsal players
21st-century African-American sportspeople
21st-century African-American women